The Museum of Ixelles, also called the (Municipal) Museum of Fine Arts of Ixelles, is a municipal art museum in Ixelles, Brussels, Belgium, focusing on Belgian art from the 19th and 20th centuries. The museum regularly organises temporary exhibitions and has a documentation centre.

The museum is located at 71, /. It is served by the bus stops / (on line 71) and Malibran (on lines 38 and 60).

History
The Museum of Fine Arts of Ixelles was founded in 1892 to house a collection of works donated by painter and collector Edmond De Pratere and grew rapidly with donations from generous patrons. The Belgian art patron Octave Maus donated more than 200 impressionist, neo-impressionist and symbolist works.

Nowadays, the museum presents a panorama of Belgian art of the 19th and 20th centuries. The collections bring together paintings, sculpture, and drawings representing the different art movements of this time. A sampling of Flemish masters and some representatives of foreign schools complete the set. A collection of posters includes a complete collection of originals by Henri de Toulouse-Lautrec.

In 2018, the museum closed for renovations and an expansion. It is planned to reopen in 2023.

Curators
Recent curators of the museum have been:
 1958–1987: Jean Cockerel
 1987–2007: Nicole d'Huart
 2007–present: Claire Leblanc

See also
 Art Nouveau in Brussels
 History of Brussels
 Culture of Belgium
 Belgium in "the long nineteenth century"

References

Notes

External links

 Official site

Museums in Brussels
Ixelles
1892 establishments in Belgium